The 2004–05 Czech Extraliga season was the 12th season of the Czech Extraliga since its creation after the breakup of Czechoslovakia and the Czechoslovak First Ice Hockey League in 1993.

Regular season

Standings

Playoffs 
Quarterfinals
HC Moeller Pardubice beats HC Rabat Kladno 4 games to 3
Bili Tygri Liberec beats HC Slavia Prague 4 games to 3
HC Hame Zlin beats HC Litvinov 4 games to 2
HC Vitkovice beats HC Sparta Prague 4 games to 1
Semifinals
HC Moeller Pardubice beats Bili Tygri Liberec 4 games to 1
HC Hame Zlin beats HC Vitkovice 4 games to 3
Final
HC Moeller Pardubice beats HC Hame Zlin 4 games to 0

Relegation

Play-out round
HC Ceske Budejovice - HC Dukla Jihlava 1–5, 5–0, 3–2, 4–0, 4-2

Dukla Jihlava is relegated

References

External links 
 

Czech Extraliga seasons
1
Czech